"As Usual" is a song written by Alex Zanetis and performed by Brenda Lee.  The song is featured on Lee's 1964 album, By Request.

Chart performance
The song reached No.12 on the Billboard Hot 100 and No.5 on the adult contemporary chart in the United States. It reached No.5 on the U.K. singles chart and No.12 on the Australian chart in 1964. 
The single was the 49th best-selling 45rpm disc of 1964 in the U.K.

References

1963 songs
1963 singles
Brenda Lee songs
Decca Records singles
Songs written by Alex Zanetis